is a survival horror video game developed and published by Koei for the Sega Dreamcast. It was released on January 20, 2000, in Japan. Plans for a western release were planned but later cancelled. The game is a sequel to the 1996 Sony PlayStation and Sega Saturn game Nanatsu no Hikan.

Gameplay
The player can control one of two characters: Kei and Reina. The game can be played in either first person, third person, or fixed camera angle (e.g. Resident Evil) views. Kei's levels are more action based, while Reina's are more adventure-based.

There is also a unique multiplayer cooperative mode where one player controls Kei and the other Reina (a feature not seen in survival horror games until the 2005 game ObsCure) This mode is different from the single-player mode, as it is much shorter and objectives, monsters, and events are all altered.

Plot
Friends Kei and Reina land on a mysterious island and search for their friend Ernest. But along the way, they encounter many different monsters in the different mansions they discover. It's up to them to defeat these foes, find their friend, and understand the mysteries of the island.

Reception
After briefly playing the multi-player mode, IGN.com stated that Nanatsu no Hikan: Senritsu no Bishō "is worth a try by importers looking for something different."

External links
 Nanatsu no Hikan: Senritsu no Bishou at GameFAQS.com
 Nanatsu no Hikan: Senritsu no Bishou Preview at IGN.com

2000 video games
Dreamcast games
Dreamcast-only games
Koei games
Horror video games
Video games developed in Japan
Video games featuring female protagonists
Video games set in Japan
Video games about zombies